Kees Bekker (26 January 1883 – 28 December 1964) was a Dutch international footballer who earned six caps for the national side between 1906 and 1908.

Club career
Bekker scored 82 goals in 150 matches for HBS Craeyenhout, where we has made honorary member in 1914. He  moved to Groningen to study medicine and play for Be Quick Groningen. He later became a surgeon.

International career
Bekker made his debut for the Netherlands in an April 1906 friendly match against Belgium and earned a total of  caps, scoring no goals. His final international was an October 1908 friendly against Sweden. He was also part of the Dutch squad for the football tournament at the 1908 Summer Olympics, but he did not play in any matches.

References

External links

1883 births
1964 deaths
Footballers from Breda
Association football defenders
Dutch footballers
Netherlands international footballers
HBS Craeyenhout players